Włodzimierz Sokołowski (3 September 1940 – 29 June 2012) was a Polish athlete. He competed in the men's pole vault at the 1964 Summer Olympics.

References

1940 births
2012 deaths
Athletes (track and field) at the 1964 Summer Olympics
Polish male pole vaulters
Olympic athletes of Poland
People from Myszków
Sportspeople from Silesian Voivodeship